Simon Yorke (24 June 1903 – 7 May 1966) was a Welsh landowner and soldier. He inherited the Erddig estate in 1922. He was High Sheriff for Denbighshire in 1937. He was a lieutenant in the Denbighshire Yeomanry and enlisted as a private in the North Staffordshire Regiment during World War II.

Simon Yorke was born in Erddig, Denbighshire, the eldest son of Philip Yorke (1849-1922). In 1922, Simon inherited the Erddig estate.  During World War II Yorke served as a private soldier in the North Staffordshire Regiment.

Simon Yorke was found dead in Erddig Park on 7 May 1966, from heart failure. He was buried in Marchwiel Churchyard, unmarried and without a direct heir. Erddig was inherited by his brother, Philip Scott Yorke, who gifted the estate to the National Trust in 1973.

References 

1903 births
1966 deaths
Alumni of Corpus Christi College, Cambridge
North Staffordshire Regiment soldiers
Welsh soldiers
Welsh landowners
Denbighshire Hussars officers
British Army personnel of World War II
Military personnel from Denbighshire